K–12 refers to primary and secondary education in the United States, Canada, and Australia.

K12 may also refer to:

Arts and entertainment 
 K–12 (album), by Melanie Martinez
 K–12 (film), the accompanying film
 Sonata in A, K. 12, by Wolfgang Amadeus Mozart
 A fictional ski slope in the film Better Off Dead

Science and mathematics
 E. coli K-12, a bacterial strain
 Keratin 12, a protein
 Coxeter–Todd lattice K12, a 12-dimensional lattice

Technology
 21 cm K 12 (E) German World War II railway gun
 AMD K12, a CPU microarchitecture
 Curtiss K-12, an aircraft engine
 S&T Motiv K12, a South Korean machine gun
 K-12, an obsolete process for Kodachrome photographic film

Vehicles 
Aircraft
 Kalinin K-12, a Soviet proof-of-concept aircraft
 Kawanishi K-12 Sakura, an experimental Japanese aircraft

Automobiles
 Kandi K12, a Chinese microcar
 Nissan Micra (K12), a Japanese subcompact car

Ships
 , a corvette of the Royal Navy
 , a submarine of the Royal Navy
 , a submarine of the Royal Netherlands Navy
 , a corvette of the Swedish Navy

Other uses
 K-12 (Kansas highway), a former highway in Kansas
 K12 (mountain)
 K12 Inc., now Stride, Inc., an American education company